Once Upon a Time is the sixth studio album of country/bluegrass singer Marty Stuart. The album is mostly acoustic, featuring mainly bluegrass songs and Marty Stuart's mandolin.  It is a retrospective of Stuart's teenage work during his time with Lester Flatt and Nashville Grass; the All Music Guide to Country describes the album as  "certainly a special compilation" of a "true musical treasure" that "documents the early years and provides a glimpse into the development of an artist of character and quality."

Track listing

Personnel
Johnny Cash - vocals on "Mother Maybelle"
Pete Corum - bass, background vocals
Lester Flatt - vocals on "The Bluebirds Are Singing for Me"
Kenny Ingram - banjo, background vocals
Curly Seckler - rhythm guitar, mandolin, background vocals, lead vocals on "What Would You Give In Exchange For Your Soul" and "Somebody Loves You Darlin'
Marty Stuart - acoustic guitar, mandolin, lead vocals, background vocals
Clarence "Tater" Tate - fiddle, background vocals, lead vocals on "Orange Blossom Special"
Blake Williams - 5-string banjo

References

1992 albums
Marty Stuart albums